Boston is the debut studio album by American rock band Boston, released on August 25, 1976, by Epic Records. It was produced by Tom Scholz and John Boylan. A multi-instrumentalist and engineer who had been involved in the Boston music scene since the late 1960s, Scholz started to write and record demos in his apartment basement with singer Brad Delp, but received numerous rejections from major record labels. The demo tape fell into the hands of CBS-owned Epic, who signed the band in 1975.

Defying Epic Records's insistence on recording the album professionally in Los Angeles, Scholz and Boylan tricked the label into thinking the band was recording on the West Coast, when in reality, the bulk was being tracked solely by Scholz at his Massachusetts home. The album's contents are a complete recreation of the band's demo tape, and contain songs written and composed many years prior. The album's style, often referred to as the "Boston sound", was developed through Scholz's love for classical music, melodic hooks and early guitar-heavy rock groups such as the Kinks and the Yardbirds, as well as a number of analogue electronic effects developed by Scholz in his home studio. Besides Scholz, who played most of the instruments on nearly all of the tracks, and Delp, other musicians appear on the album such as drummers Jim Masdea and Sib Hashian, guitarist Barry Goudreau and bassist Fran Sheehan. All except Masdea became full-time band members.

The album was released by Epic in August 1976 and broke sales records, becoming the best-selling debut LP in the US at the time, and winning the RIAA Century Award as best selling debut album. The album's singles, "More Than a Feeling", "Peace of Mind" and "Foreplay/Long Time", were major AM and FM hits, and nearly the entire album receives constant airplay on classic rock radio. The album is often referred to as a staple in '70s rock and has been included on many lists of essential albums. It has sold at least 17 million copies in the United States alone and at least 20 million worldwide making it one of the best selling debut albums of all time.

Background
In the late 1960s, Tom Scholz began attending the Massachusetts Institute of Technology (MIT), where he first wrote music. After graduating with a master's degree, he began working for the Polaroid Corporation in the product development division. By night, he played keyboards for bands in the Boston bar and club scene, where he collaborated with drummer Jim Masdea. The two - who shared a concept of the perfect rock band, one "with crystal-clear vocals and bone-crunching guitars" - viewed themselves as only part-time musicians. Despite this, the duo built a small studio near Watertown, Massachusetts to record ideas. Scholz recorded for hours on end, often re-recording, erasing and discarding tapes in an effort to create "a perfect song". 

Both musicians later joined Mother's Milk, a band featuring guitarist Barry Goudreau, that vied for recognition in the Boston music scene. Scholz quickly went from keyboardist to lead songwriter, and the band went through dozens of lead vocalists before Brad Delp auditioned. 

Delp, a former factory worker at a Danvers electric coil company, spent much of his weekends in cover bands. Delp drove to Revere Beach, where the three-piece were performing at a club named Jojo's. 

Delp was impressed that the band had recorded a demo tape and were still recording, and earned his position in the band after auditioning the Joe Walsh song "Rocky Mountain Way". Mother's Milk became an early version of Boston, with Goudreau on lead guitar.

By 1973, the band had a six-song demo tape ready for mailing, and Scholz and his wife Cindy sent copies to every record company they could find. The songs on the demo were "More Than a Feeling", "Peace of Mind", "Rock & Roll Band", "Something About You", “San Francisco Day” (later changed and renamed "Hitch a Ride") and “Love” (later changed to "Don't Be Afraid”). The group received rejection slips from several labels - RCA, Capitol, Atlantic and Elektra among the most notable - and Epic Records rejected the tape flatly with a "very insulting letter" signed by company head Lennie Petze that opined the band "offered nothing new". The tape that received the most attention contained embryonic renditions of future songs that would appear on Boston's debut album. Financial reality encroached the dream for Delp, who departed shortly thereafter because "there just wasn't any money coming in". 

By 1975, Tom Scholz was finished with the club scene, concentrating exclusively on the demo tapes he recorded at home in his basement. Scholz was renting the house and spent much of his funds on recording equipment; at one point, he spent the money he had saved for a down payment on a future home on a used professional 12-track tape recorder made by Scully Recording Instruments. 

He called Delp to provide vocals, remarking, "If you can't really afford to join the band or if you don't want to join the band, maybe you'd just want to come down to the studio and sing on some of these tapes for me." 

Scholz had given the Mother's Milk demo to a Polaroid co-worker whose cousin worked at ABC Records (who had signed one of Scholz's favorite bands, the James Gang). The employee forgot to mail the tape out and it sat in his desk for months until Columbia began contacting Scholz, after which he sent the tape to ABC.

Charles McKenzie, a New England representative for ABC Records, first overheard the tape in a co-worker's office. He called Paul Ahern, an independent record promoter in California, with whom he held a gentleman's agreement that if either heard anything interesting, they would inform the other.

Ahern had a connection with Petze at Epic and informed him, even though Petze had passed on the original Mother's Milk demos. 

Epic contacted Scholz and offered a contract that first required the group to perform in a showcase for CBS representatives, as the label felt curious that the "band" was in reality a "mad genius at work in a basement". 

Masdea had started to lose interest in the project by this time, and Scholz called Goudreau and two other performers who had recorded on the early demos, bass player Fran Sheehan and drummer Dave Currier, to complete the lineup. In November 1975, the group performed for the executives in a Boston warehouse that doubled as Aerosmith's practice facility. 

Mother's Milk was signed by CBS Records one month later in a contract that required 10 albums over six years. Currier quit before he knew the band passed the audition, and Scholz recruited drummer Sib Hashian in his place. 

Epic had signed an agreement with NABET, the union representing electrical and broadcast engineers, which specified that any recording done outside of a Columbia-owned studio but within a 250-mile radius of one of those studios required that a paid union engineer be present. 

As such, the label wanted the band to travel to Los Angeles and re-record their songs with a different producer. Scholz was unhappy with being unable to be in charge, and John Boylan, a friend of a friend of Ahern, came on board the project. 

Boylan's duty was to "run interference for the label and keep them happy", and he made a crucial suggestion: that the band change their name to Boston.

Recording and production

Boston was recorded primarily at Scholz's own Foxglove Studios in Watertown in "an elaborate end run around the CBS brain trust." Epic wanted a studio version that sounded identical to the demo tape, and Scholz decided he could not work in a production studio, having adapted to home recording for several years, stating "I work[ed] alone, and that was it." 

Scholz took a leave of absence from Polaroid, and was gone for several months to record the band's album. "I would wake up every day and go downstairs and start playing," he recalled. Scholz grew annoyed reproducing the parts, being forced to use the same equipment used on the demo. 

The basement, located in a lower-middle-class neighborhood on School Street, was described by Scholz as a "tiny little space next to the furnace in this hideous pine-paneled basement of my apartment house, and it flooded from time to time with God knows what." 

There was a Hammond organ and a Leslie speaker stuffed in the corner of the room alongside the drums; whenever it was time to record the organ parts, they would tear the drums down and pull out the Leslie. 

Boylan felt that while Scholz's guitars "sounded amazing," Scholz did not understand how to properly record acoustic instruments, and flew in engineer Paul Grupp to instruct him on microphone technique.

Boylan's own hands-on involvement would center on recording the vocals and mixing, and he took the rest of the band out to the West Coast, where they recorded "Let Me Take You Home Tonight". "It was a decoy," recalled Scholz, who recorded the bulk back home in Watertown without CBS's knowledge. While Boylan arranged for Delp to have a custom-made Taylor acoustic guitar for thousands of dollars charged to the album budget, Scholz recorded such tracks as "More Than a Feeling" in his basement with a $100 Yamaha acoustic guitar. 

That spring, Boylan returned to Watertown to hear the tracks, on which Scholz had recut drums and other percussion and keyboard parts. He then hired a remote truck from Providence, Rhode Island to come to Watertown, where it ran a snake through the basement window of Scholz's home to transfer his tracks to a 3M-79 2-inch 24-track deck. The entire recording was completed in the basement, save for Delp's vocals, which were recorded at Capitol Studios' Studio C with Warren Dewey engineering the overdubs. 

All vocals were double-tracked except the lead vocal, and all the parts were done by Delp in quick succession. When Scholz arrived in Los Angeles for mixing, he felt intimidated and feared the professional engineers would view him as "a hick that worked in a basement." Instead, Scholz felt they were backwards in their approach and lacked knowledge he had obtained. "These people were so swept up in how cool they were and how important it was to have all this high-priced crap that they couldn't see the forest for the trees," he said. 

Boylan encountered his only real confrontation with the autocratic Scholz during the mixing stage, in which Scholz handled the guitar tracks, Boylan the drums and Dewey the vocals, with Steve Hodge assisting. Scholz pushed guitars too high in the mix, rendering vocals inaudible at times.

The entire operation has been described as "one of the most complex corporate capers in the history of the music business." With the exception of "Let Me Take You Home Tonight", the album was a virtual copy of the demo tapes. The album was recorded for a cost of a few thousand dollars, a paltry amount in an industry accustomed to spending hundreds of thousands on a single recording.

Music

Boston is composed mainly of songs written many years prior to their appearance on the album. Scholz wrote or cowrote every song on the first album (with the exception of "Let Me Take You Home Tonight," written by Delp), played virtually all of the instruments and recorded and engineered all the tracks. The "Boston sound" combines "big, giant melodic hooks" with "massively heavy, classically-inspired guitar parts." For Scholz, the idea of beautiful vocal harmonies was inspired by The Left Banke, and the guitar-driven aspect was influenced by the Kinks, the Yardbirds and Blue Cheer. Another signature element of the "Boston sound" in terms of production involves the balance between acoustic and electric guitars. To this end, Scholz was inspired by his childhood listening of classical music, noting that the "basic concept" of setting the listener up for a change that is coming in the music had been explored for hundreds of years in classical compositions. The record also makes use of multiple-part harmonized guitar solos and baroque melodic devices known as mordents.

"More Than a Feeling" is an ode to daydreaming, and contains a guitar solo reminiscent of "Telstar". The track was inspired by a love affair that Scholz had years prior while in school. "Walk Away Renée" by The Left Banke was popular at the time, and it caused Scholz to pine miserably over the girl. "More Than a Feeling" unintentionally incorporates a chord progression from that particular song following the line "I see my Mary Ann walking away." Scholz initially felt it was his best shot at a lead single, but became depressed when doubts got the best of him. Ahern, however, loved the track and was sure it would receive maximum airplay. "Peace of Mind" was penned about Scholz's Polaroid superiors, and recorded around the fall of 1974. "Foreplay," the extensive introduction to "Long Time," was actually composed many years prior in 1972. "Rock & Roll Band", a track that dated back to the band's Mother's Milk demo, was inspired by Masdea's experiences performing in various bar combos, and was written just as "pure fantasy." The album version still features Masdea's drums from the demo tape. "Smokin'", was written and recorded in 1973, and called "Shakin'". "Hitch a Ride" was originally titled "San Francisco Day", with lyrics starting in New York City and then planning to hitch a ride to "head for the other side". This was the first song Delp re-recorded after the original Mother's Milk vocalist left. To create the special effect of a bent note on the track's organ solo, Scholz slowed down one of the recording reels with his finger.  "Something About You" was originally "Life Isn't Easy" and was written around 1975, and as the last demo, it was put as the second to last track.

The trademark sci-fi theme of the record cover was Scholz' concept: "The idea was escape; I thought of a 'spaceship guitar.' " The original spaceship was designed in 1976 by Paula Scher and illustrated by Roger Huyssen with lettering by Gerard Huerta for Epic Records.

Release

Boston was released by Epic Records on August 23, 1976. (according to some other sources - August 25). The album broke out of Cleveland first, and the following week, it had been added at 392 stations. Had the record been unsuccessful, Scholz, then 29, planned to abandon his rock and roll dream; he still worked at Polaroid during the first few weeks of the record's success. Scholz felt pessimistic about the success until the album sold 200,000 copies. "And all of a sudden I realized I was in the music business," he told Rolling Stone. "I got word on what the sales figures were while I was still at Polaroid full-time. It wasn't easy staying there two more weeks." Critics were kind to Boston; Rolling Stone wrote that "The group's affinity for heavy rock & roll provides a sense of dynamics that coheres magnetically with sophisticated progressive structures."

The album was certified gold two months after its release, and sold another 500,000 copies within 30 days, going platinum for the first time in November 1976. 

By January 1977, the debut disc sold two million copies, making it one of the fastest selling debut albums in rock history. "More Than a Feeling" became a hit single on both AM Top 40 stations (with its second verse deleted for time constraints), and on FM "AOR" stations (with the second verse left intact). 

"I was at Polaroid when I first heard 'More Than A Feeling' on the radio," said Tom Scholz. "I was listening to somebody else's radio. The first week the album came out, it did better than I expected." Epic Records was pleased with their new acquisition—Boston and another new band, Wild Cherry, were among Epic's biggest success stories of 1976. 

The album was afforded several accolades, including a Grammy Award nomination for Best New Artist. Boston sold six million albums, including records, 8-tracks and cassettes by December 1977. For massive popularity, Boston was considered to rival established stars such as Peter Frampton, Fleetwood Mac and Stevie Wonder.

By 1986, the album had been certified for over nine million sales domestically, and Boston went diamond in 1990. By November 2003, the album was certified by the Recording Industry Association of America for sales of 17 million. Worldwide, the album has sold 20 million copies. 

The album is the second best-selling debut album of all time in the United States, after Guns N' Roses's Appetite for Destruction, and it is the joint eighth best-selling album in US history. Boston, along with the band's 1978 follow-up Don't Look Back, was remastered in 2006 by Scholz.

Reception

The album soared, with three singles becoming Top 40 hits. All eight of the songs on the album receive regular airplay on classic rock radio decades later. Taking a mere three weeks to earn an RIAA Gold Record Award (500,000 in unit sales) in 1976, and a Platinum Award (1,000,000 in unit sales) after three months on November 11, 1976, it was the fastest selling debut album for any American group. It has continued to sell very well, accumulating 9 million in sales by the 10th anniversary in 1986, reaching diamond in 1990, and 17× platinum by 2003.

Touring
The first tour in support of the album was a short six-week promotional club tour throughout the Midwest. Boston soon found themselves on a nationwide tour that lasted 10 months. "We started playing the Agoras in Cleveland and Columbus," said Delp. "500–1000 seat clubs. The response was great, I was amazed that people were singing along with all the songs. It really impressed upon me the power of radio, the fact that wherever we went, they were just playing the record and people just came, and it was great." However, several bands that the group opened for were less than enthusiastic to meet them. At one point, they were opening for Foghat, but lost the gig when a Milwaukee disc jockey introduced Boston, not headliner Foghat, as the best rock and roll band in the world. While the band were apprehensive about opening for Black Sabbath, the experience was pleasant. "The great thing about Black Sabbath was that they didn't do soundchecks," remembered Delp. "So we were afforded all the time we wanted on stage, Ozzy Osbourne would say, 'Ahh, you wanna go up and play some songs, go ahead.' They couldn't have been nicer."

Boston eventually began headlining shows in 1977, and sold out four Southern California concert halls within a one-week span. Bob Seger and the Silver Bullet Band opened for Boston in Detroit. On their swing back to the Northeast, they sold out two nights in the Philadelphia Spectrum—and in their New York City debut, three sold-out shows at Madison Square Garden. "I sold out arenas with this group in four cities from Lincoln, Nebraska to Louisville, Kentucky," said concert promoter Bob Bagaris to Billboard. "I've never seen such universal penetration of key secondary markets by any major group. Even the biggest acts usually don't do so well in every market."

Legacy
Boston has been described as a pivot in the transition of mainstream American rock from blues-based proto-metal to power pop, "combining some of the ebullience of the rock era's early days with the precision and technology that would mark rock record productions from then on." All eight songs—most commonly the album's A-side—are in constant rotation on classic rock radio. Boston's success ushered in the next wave of "producer" rock sound. Following the album's success, its sound became imitated by several other prominent rock bands of the era. The record created a reference point for production values and studio technology that would stand for years.  The album is hailed as one of the greatest in rock history, with an inclusion in the book 1001 Albums You Must Hear Before You Die. The album was also ranked No. 43 on the Rock and Roll Hall of Fame's "Definitive 200" list.

Track listing

Personnel

Ref:

Boston 
 Tom Scholz – lead and rhythm guitar, acoustic guitar, special guitar effects, bass, organ, clavinet, percussion, producer, engineer
 Brad Delp – lead and harmony vocals, 12-string acoustic guitar, rhythm guitar, percussion
 Barry Goudreau – lead and rhythm guitar
 Fran Sheehan – bass
 Sib Hashian – drums, percussion

Technical personnel 
 John Boylan – producer
 Warren Dewey – engineer
 Deni King, Bruce Hensel, Doug Ryder – assistant engineer
 Steve Hodge – assistant in mixing
 Wally Traugott – mastering
 Toby Mountain, Bill Ryan – remastering
 Tom "Curly" Ruff – digital transfer

Additional personnel 
 Jim Masdea – drums (on "Rock & Roll Band")
 Paul Ahern, Charles McKenzie – art direction
 Kim Hart – design consulting
 Jeff Albertson, Ron Pownall – photography
 Paula Scher – cover designer
 Roger Huyssen – cover illustration
 Joel Zimmerman – reissue design

Charts

Weekly charts

Year-end charts

Certifications

 (Diamond)

See also
List of best-selling albums
List of best-selling albums in the United States
List of diamond-certified albums in Canada
Boston discography

References

External links
 Album online on Radio3Net a radio channel of Romanian Radio Broadcasting Company

Albums produced by John Boylan (record producer)
Albums produced by Tom Scholz
Boston (band) albums
CBS Records albums
1976 albums
1976 debut albums
Hard rock albums
Epic Records albums
Albums recorded at Capitol Studios